HMS F1 was a British F class submarine of the Royal Navy. She was built at Chatham Dockyard, laid down 1 December 1913 and launched 31 March 1915.

F1 was broken up in Portsmouth in 1920.

References 
 

 

British F-class submarines
1915 ships
Royal Navy ship names